Michael Karin is an Israeli-American Distinguished Professor of Pharmacology, Ben and Wanda Hildyard Chair for Mitochondrial and Metabolic Diseases, American Cancer Society Research Professor at the University of California, San Diego.

Early life and education
Karin was born in Tel Aviv, Israel in 1951. He went to high school with fellow NAS member Adi Shamir. He graduated magna cum laude in 1975 from Tel Aviv University in biology. He received his Ph.D. in molecular biology from University of California, Los Angeles in 1979, where he studied genetic regulation of metallothioneins. He then completed postdoctoral fellowships with Beatrice Mintz at the Fox Chase Cancer Center, and subsequently with John Baxter at the University of California, San Francisco.

Career
In 1982, Karin was hired as Assistant Professor of Microbiology at the University of Southern California. In 1986, he moved to the University of California, San Diego. At UCSD Karin has continued his studies of metallothionein gene regulation, mapping promoter elements that mediate gene induction by heavy metals, phorbol ester tumor promoters and glucocorticoid hormone. This work led to identification of AP-1 transcription factors, later found to be composed of Jun and Fos prototo- oncoproteins. Studying how phosphorylation of c Jun controls its transcriptional activity the Karin lab discovered the Jun N terminal kinase (JNK) subgroup of MAP kinases and moleculary cloned them in collaboration with Roger Davis. Following their charting of the JNK signaling pathway, Karin and coworkers have begun to study the role of protein phosphorylation in control of NF-κB activity. That work has led to identification and molecular cloning of the IκB kinase (IKK) complex, which has turned out to be one of the major activators of the inflammatory response and innate immunity. Having found that IKK dependent NF-κB activation suppresses programmed cell death, Karin and colleagues postulated that NF-κB provided the long suspected mechanistic link between inflammation and cancer. Within two years of making this proposal they obtained strong experimental evidence that NF-κB activation does provide a major mechanism through which inflammation and infection promote cancer development, especially in the gastrointestinal track. The Karin lab was also the first to show how hepatic steatosis stimulates development of hepatocellular carcinoma (HCC), the major liver cancer form. They also developed a highly efficient and robust model for studying how HCC development is promoted by the common metabolic disorder non-alcoholic steatohepatitis (NASH). Using the so-called MUP-uPA mouse they demonstrated that NASH development depends on ER stress and TNF-mediated inflammation. NASH to HCC progression depends on suppression of CD8 T cell-mediated immunosurveillance, caused by accumulation of immunosuppressive IgA producing plasma cells. These pathogenic mechanisms were shown to be clinically relevant, thus providing an explanation to the surprising efficacy of PD-1 checkpoint inhibitory drugs in human non-viral HCC.

Awards
2005 – Elected Member of the National Academy of Sciences, Washington, DC 
2007 – Elected Foreign Associate of the European Molecular Biology Organization 
2011 – Elected Member of the Institute of Medicine                                               
2011 – Harvey Prize in Human Health
2013 – William B. Coley Award for Distinguished Research in Basic and Tumor Immunology, Cancer Research Institute
2013 – Charles Rodolphe Brupbacher Prize
2017 – Elected Fellow of the AACR Academy

References

Year of birth missing (living people)
Living people
American molecular biologists
American pharmacologists
Fellows of the AACR Academy
Tel Aviv University alumni
University of California, Los Angeles alumni
University of California, San Diego faculty
Members of the United States National Academy of Sciences
People from Tel Aviv
Members of the National Academy of Medicine